In mathematics, the generalized symmetric group is the wreath product  of the cyclic group of order m and the symmetric group of order n.

Examples 
 For  the generalized symmetric group is exactly the ordinary symmetric group: 
 For  one can consider the cyclic group of order 2 as positives and negatives and identify the generalized symmetric group  with the signed symmetric group.

Representation theory 

As with the symmetric group, the representations can be constructed in terms of Specht modules; see .

Homology 

The second homology group (in classical terms, the Schur multiplier) is given by :

References 

 
 
 

Permutation groups